In mathematics, the simplex category (or simplicial category or nonempty finite ordinal category) is the category of non-empty finite ordinals and order-preserving maps. It is used to define simplicial and cosimplicial objects.

Formal definition

There are several equivalent descriptions of this category.  can be described as the category of non-empty finite ordinals as objects, thought of as totally ordered sets, and (non-strictly) order-preserving functions as morphisms. The objects are commonly denoted  (so that  is the ordinal ). The category is generated by coface and codegeneracy  maps, which amount to inserting or deleting elements of the orderings. (See simplicial set for relations of these maps.)

For instance, simplicial sets are contravariant with the codomain category being the category of sets.

Augmented simplex category
Accordingly, this category might also be denoted FinOrd. The augmented simplex category is occasionally referred to as algebraists' simplex category and the above version is called topologists' simplex category.

The augmented simplex category, unlike the simplex category, admits a natural monoidal structure. The monoidal product is given by concatenation of linear orders, and the unit is the empty ordinal  (the lack of a unit prevents this from qualifying as a monoidal structure on ). Similarly, this also illuminates the construction of simplicial objects from monads (and hence adjoint functors) since monads can be viewed as monoid objects in endofunctor categories.

See also 

 Simplicial category
 PROP (category theory)
 Abstract simplicial complex

References

External links

What's special about the Simplex category?

Algebraic topology
Homotopy theory
 
Categories in category theory
Free algebraic structures